Aimy in a Cage is a 2015 American fantasy film written, directed, and produced by Hooroo Jackson. The film was released on January 8, 2016, and stars Allisyn Ashley Arm as Aimy. Terry Moore, Crispin Glover, and Paz de la Huerta co-star.

Premise
Aimy is a young teenager living in a world where a plague is slowly spreading throughout the world. Any teenagers that rebel against the system are given Wolworth Surgery, which changes them into controllable model citizens. The film takes place entirely within the family's apartment, while they attempt to civilize Aimy in an escalating cat and mouse battle, and the world ends around them.

Cast
Allisyn Ashley Arm as Aimy Micry
Crispin Glover as Claude Bohringer
Paz de la Huerta as Caroline
Terry Moore as Grandma Micry
Michael William Hunter as Steve
Theodore Bouloukos as Gruzzlebird Micry
Sara Murphy as Kelly Moss
Frank Mosley as News Anchor
Rick Montgomery Jr. as Commander Lopchocks
Gabby Tary as Grandma Moss
Maria Deasy as Jackie Moss
Sam Quartin as Dr. Issie
Nicholas Goroff as HAZMAT Tech
David Croley Broyles as HAZMAT Tech

Production
The film is adapted from a graphic novel by Jackson.  To finance it, Jackson sold off most of his possessions in 2012 and invested in Bitcoin, making it the first Bitcoin financed feature film in history, at the total budget of $500,000. Shooting took place in Boston, Massachusetts.

Release
Aimy in a Cage premiered at the Portland Film Festival in September 2015 where it was awarded the Director's Prize winner. It was released to video on demand and on DVD on January 8, 2016.

Reception
Rotten Tomatoes reports that 50% of six surveyed critics gave the film a positive review.  Andrew L. Urban of Urban Cinefile] wrote, "It is an idiosyncratic, unique and brave film; while Jackson may draw inspiration from Terry Gilliam, Ken Russell, and David Lynch, he copies none of them." On Irish Film Critic, Alex Saveliev speculated that it was possibly meant as an allegory, a parable, or a "statement on the collapse of the nuclear family", but wrote that it "fail[ed] to elicit much more than a pounding headache". John Noonan of Filmink rated it 15/20 and called it "a Lynchian neon fairy-tale" about sexism and mental health. Courney Button of Starburst rated it 1/10 stars and wrote, "Aimy in a Cage is an annoying frenzy of a film that will push your patience further than any film should."

References

External links
 

2015 films
2015 fantasy films
American fantasy films
2010s English-language films
2010s American films